Miki Howard is the third studio album by American R&B singer Miki Howard, released in 1989 on Atlantic Records. The album peaked at No. 4 on the Billboard Top R&B Albums chart. Howard scored her first number-one song with the lead single released from the album, "Ain't Nuthin' in the World", on the Billboard R&B Singles chart.

The follow-up singles, "Love Under New Management" written by Philly songwriters Gabriel Hardeman, Annette Hardeman and G Syier Hawkins Brown, and a cover of Aretha Franklin's 1974 number-one R&B hit, "Until You Come Back to Me (That's What I'm Gonna Do)", both scored top five success peaking at No. 2 and No. 3, respectively, on the R&B Singles chart. Howard's version of "Until You Come Back to Me (That's What I'm Gonna Do)" also reached No. 67 on the UK Singles Chart, her first and only song on this chart.

Track listing

Notes

"I'll Be Your Shoulder", "Mister" features background vocals by Gerald Levert, and "Just the Way You Want Me To" features background vocals by Eddie Levert, Sr. of The O'Jays, Terry Stubbs, Gerald and Sean Levert. "Love Me All Over" features  background vocals by R&B singer Keith Washington. "Who Ever Said It Was Love" produced by Larry Blackmon of Cameo.

Charts

Weekly charts

Singles

References

External links
mikihowardmedia.com
Miki Howard on cduniverse.com

1989 albums
Miki Howard albums
Atlantic Records albums